Arion is a journal of humanities and the classics published at Boston University (BU). The editor-in-chief is Herbert Golder, a professor of classics at BU.

Arion was founded in 1962 at the University of Texas, and was revived by Golder in 1990. It now appears three times per year, publishing essays, reviews, translations, and original fiction and verse.

A number of prominent poets, scholars, and intellectuals have appeared in Arion, including Camille Paglia, Tony Harrison, Anne Carson, Christopher Ricks, and Raymond Geuss.

History
Arion was founded under the auspices of classicist and translator William Arrowsmith.  Additional founding editors included D.S. Carne-Ross, J.P. Sullivan, and Frederic Will. It ran for nine volumes as a quarterly at UT until 1972, and was revived by Arrowsmith in the 1970s at Boston University, where it ran for three more volumes as a quarterly (new series 1–3) before being discontinued. It was revived in 1992 under Herbert Golder, and has through 2014 published 22 volumes as a triquarterly (third series 1-22).

References

External links
Arion website

1962 establishments in Texas
Boston University
Magazines established in 1962
Magazines published in Austin, Texas
Magazines published in Boston
Quarterly magazines published in the United States
Triannual magazines published in the United States
University of Texas System
Visual arts magazines published in the United States